Red Electoral Alliance (RV) was an alliance of far-left groups formed into a Norwegian political party to promote revolutionary socialism ideals into the Norwegian parliament. The party dissolved itself on 10 March 2007, when it participated in the founding of a new party, Red (Rødt).

Raud Ungdom or Rød Ungdom (Red Youth) was their youth organization.

History

While it was formed in 1973 as an election front for the Worker's Communist Party (marxist-leninist) (in Norwegian: Arbeidernes Kommunistparti (m-l), AKP(ml)), the Red Electoral Alliance became an independent party in 1991, and after that, it scrapped many Leninist ideas. It remained a revolutionary party that, promoting an ideology based upon Marxism.

From 1993 to 1997, Erling Folkvord represented RV in Stortinget, the Norwegian parliament. In 1997 the party got their highest recorded percentage of votes, with 1.7%. In spite of this, Folkvord lost his seat and no new seats were won.

Torstein Dahle, an economist at Bergen University College, was elected leader in 2003 and re-elected in March 2005. Following the 2005 election it was clear that their work to regain their place in the parliament had failed. They received 1.2% of the national total of votes. It was clear that in order to be represented in parliament, they had to win a large share of votes in Hordaland or Oslo. However their best result was 3.4% in Hordaland.

On 10 March 2007 the party dissolved itself, as it merged with the AKP into a new party, Red, with Dahle as its leader. Due to Norwegian election laws, the name Red Electoral Alliance was kept for the 2007 local elections. The party currently has 57 representatives in town halls nationwide.

Party leaders

 1973-1975 — Sigurd Allern1
 1975-1979 — Pål Steigan1
 1979-1981 — Hilde Haugsgjerd
 1981-1983 — Finn Sjue
 1983-1987 — Jahn Arne Olsen
 1987-1995 — Aksel Nærstad
 1995-1997 — Jørn Magdahl
 1997-2003 — Aslak Sira Myhre
 2003-2007 — Torstein Dahle

1 Until 1979, the leader of AKP was also the leader of RV.

Parliamentary election results 

*: In 1989 RV participated in an electoral alliance with other groups called County Lists for Environment and Solidarity.

References

External links
 Rød Valgallianse (Red Electoral Alliance) - Official web site
 Rød Ungdom (Red Youth) - Official site of the youth party
Election results for RV in the 2007 local elections

1973 establishments in Norway
Communist parties in Norway
Defunct political parties in Norway
Political parties disestablished in 2007
Political parties established in 1973
Political party alliances in Norway
Red Party (Norway)
Workers' Communist Party (Norway)